is a passenger railway station located in the Gorikida neighborhood of  Asao-ku, Kawasaki, Kanagawa, Japan and operated by the private railway operator Odakyu Electric Railway.

Lines
Satsukidai Station is served by the Odakyu Tama Line, and is 1.5 kilometers from the terminus of the line at ..

Station layout
The station consists of two opposed side platforms serving two tracks, with an elevated station building over the platforms and tracks.

Platforms

History
Satsukidai Station was opened on June 1, 1974. In the year 2004 the station became a Section Semi-Express stop. The station building was remodeled in 2006.

Passenger statistics
In fiscal 2019, the station was used by an average of 10,192  passengers daily.

The passenger figures for previous years are as shown below.

Surrounding area 
 Kawasaki Shiritsu Katahira Elementary School
 Kawasaki Shiritsu Shiratori Junior High School
 Kakio Gakuen

See also
 List of railway stations in Japan

References

External links

  

Railway stations in Kanagawa Prefecture
Railway stations in Japan opened in 1974
Stations of Odakyu Electric Railway
Railway stations in Kawasaki, Kanagawa